Forehoe and Henstead Rural Districts were adjacent rural districts in Norfolk, England from 1894 to 1935.

They were formed under the Local Government Act 1894 based on rural sanitary districts of the same names, and lay generally south of Norwich.

In 1935 the Wymondham parish of Forehoe RD was created a new Wymondham Urban District. The remainder, together with the whole of Henstead RD apart from an island in the River Yare, were merged to form Forehoe and Henstead Rural District. Subsequently, changes to the border with Norwich County Borough were made in 1968.

In 1974, the merged district was abolished under the Local Government Act 1972, and became part of the South Norfolk district.

Statistics

Parishes
These parishes operated within Forehoe and Henstead RD unless otherwise indicated.

References

Districts of England created by the Local Government Act 1894
Districts of England abolished by the Local Government Act 1972
Historical districts of Norfolk
Rural districts of England